BankChain is a platform for banks for implementing blockchain software. BankChain was announced on 8 February 2017 by State Bank of India (SBI), India's largest bank.

BankChain has been formed in collaboration with Primechain Technologies, a Pune-based startup.

Members 
BankChain members include State Bank of India, ICICI Bank, DCB Bank, Kotak Mahindra Bank, Federal Bank, Deutsche Bank and UAE Exchange.

Projects 
The active projects for 2017 include shared KYC / AML, syndication of loans / consortium lending, trade finance, asset registry & asset re-hypothecation, secure documents, cross border payments, peer-to-peer payments, and blockchain security controls.

References

External links
Official Website

Blockchains